Mandarin Oriental, Taipei is a luxury hotel located in Songshan District, Taipei, Taiwan close to Taipei Songshan Airport, Breeze Center and Taipei Arena. The hotel, opened in May 2014, is managed by Mandarin Oriental Hotel Group. The hotel includes 303 rooms and suites, 6 restaurants and bars, and the Spa at Mandarin Oriental, Taipei.

Location
Mandarin Oriental, Taipei is located in Songshan District, near Taipei Songshan Airport, a mid-size international airport with scheduled flights to domestic destinations in Taiwan as well as other international destinations including Seoul, Tokyo, and a variety of cities in mainland China.

The hotel is in close proximity to Xinyi District, which contains numerous shopping centres, entertainment venues and tourist attractions, such as the Taipei World Trade Center, National Sun Yat-sen Memorial Hall and Taipei 101.

Public transportation

Taipei Metro
 Wenhu Line
 Zhongshan Junior High School metro station
 Songshan-Xindian Line
 Taipei Arena metro station

The Hotel
The architectural and interior designs of Mandarin Oriental, Taipei is greatly influenced by a blend of classic European and Asian styles, including a 50,000-piece crystal chandelier located in the hotel's lobby designed by Czech artist Tafana Dvorakova.

The hotel operates 303 guest rooms and suites, offering a variety of luxurious facilities such as bathrooms with heated marble floors and separate powder rooms. The hotel also offers a spa with sauna and Asian-style treatments, an outdoor pool, as well as conference and banquet facilities. The hotel houses six restaurants, as well as a bar and a private lounge.

Restaurants and Bars
The Jade Lounge: An afternoon tea area
Ya Ge: A Chinese style restaurant offering dim sum and a wide range of Chinese dishes
Café Un Deux Trois: A café offering a selection of international cuisine
Bencotto: An Italian restaurant with an open kitchen
The Mandarin Cake Shop: A pastry shop offering a variety of breads, chocolates and desserts
Champagne Bar: A bar featuring stylish Art Deco cocktails

Gallery

See also
Mandarin Oriental Hotel Group
Mandarin Oriental, Barcelona
Mandarin Oriental, Hong Kong
Mandarin Oriental Hyde Park, London
Mandarin Oriental, Miami
Mandarin Oriental, New York
Mandarin Oriental, Tokyo
Mandarin Oriental, Singapore

References

External links

 Official Website of Mandarin Oriental, Taipei
 Mandarin Oriental, Taipei - TaiwanStay.net

Taipei
Buildings and structures completed in 2014
Hotels established in 2014
Hotel buildings completed in 2014
Hotels in Taipei